5-11 can refer to:
 May 11 (month-day date notation)
 5 November (day-month date notation)
 5th Battalion 11th Marines